Digby was a hamlet on the eastern edge of the city of Exeter in Devon, England, located by Clyst Heath.

Between 1886 and 1987 it was the location of Exeter Lunatic Asylum, later known as Digby Hospital. Today it is mainly an area of housing, out-of-town retail and light industrial developments on the outskirts of the city, served by Digby and Sowton railway station.

References

Areas of Exeter